The German word Burg means castle. Burg or Bürg may refer to:

Places

Placename element
 -burg, a combining form in Dutch, German and English placenames
 Burg, a variant of burh, the fortified towns of Saxon England

Settlements
 Burg, Aargau, Switzerland
 Burg, Bernkastel-Wittlich, Germany
 Burg, Bitburg-Prüm, Germany
 Burg, Brandenburg, Germany
 Burg, Dithmarschen, Germany
 Burg auf Fehmarn, Germany
 Burg bei Magdeburg, Germany
 Burg im Leimental, Switzerland
 Den Burg, Netherlands
 The Burg, Illinois, United States
 Burg, Hautes-Pyrénées, France
 Burg, Kilninian and Kilmore, a place on the Isle of Mull, Argyll and Bute, Scotland
 Melber, Kentucky, United States, also known as Burg

Other uses 
 Burg (surname) or Bürg
 Bürg (crater)
 Burg (ship, 2003), a car ferry operating on Switzerland's Lake Zurich
Burgs (fast-food chain)

See also
 
 Burgh (disambiguation)
 Borg (disambiguation)
 Bourg (disambiguation)
 Borough and -bury, common English variants of burg
 Burgh, the common Scottish variant of burg
 Burger (disambiguation)
 Bürger
 Burgher (disambiguation)
 Berg (disambiguation), a placename meaning "mountain" or "rock", frequently confused with burg
 Burgk, a settlement in Germany